Serpeysk is a village (selo) in Meshchovsky District of Kaluga Oblast, Russia, located on the Serpeyka River.

History
It was first noted in 1406 as a military fort of the Grand Duchy of Lithuania on its border with Muscovy. Later on, it was annexed to Muscovy by Ivan III of Russia, then recaptured by the Polish–Lithuanian Commonwealth, and eventually incorporated into Muscovite Russia after the signing of Treaty of Polyanovka which marked the end of the Smolensk War in 1634. Once stripped of its garrison, the town dwindled into oblivion. The oldest surviving buildings are two churches, one dating from 1771 and the other constructed in the 1780s. In the late 19th century, it had a population of 1,818.

References

Rural localities in Kaluga Oblast
Smolensk Voivodeship
Meshchovsky Uyezd